In the mathematical area of graph theory, a chordal bipartite graph is a bipartite graph B = (X,Y,E) in which every cycle of length at least 6 in B has a chord, i.e., an edge that connects two vertices that are a distance > 1 apart from each other in the cycle.

A better name would be weakly chordal and bipartite since chordal bipartite graphs are in general not chordal as the induced cycle of length 4 shows.

Characterizations
Chordal bipartite graphs have various characterizations in terms of perfect elimination orderings, hypergraphs and matrices. They are closely related to strongly chordal graphs. 
By definition, chordal bipartite graphs have a forbidden subgraph characterization as the graphs that do not contain 
any induced cycle of length 3 or of length at least 5 (so-called holes) as an induced subgraph. Thus, a graph G is chordal bipartite if and only if 
G is triangle-free and hole-free. In , two other characterizations are mentioned: 
B is chordal bipartite if and only if every minimal edge separator induces a complete bipartite subgraph in B if and only if every induced 
subgraph is perfect elimination bipartite.

Martin Farber has shown: A graph is strongly chordal if and only if the bipartite incidence graph of its clique hypergraph is chordal bipartite. 

A similar characterization holds for the closed neighborhood hypergraph: A graph is strongly chordal if and only if the bipartite incidence graph of its 
closed neighborhood hypergraph is chordal bipartite.

Another result found by Elias Dahlhaus is: A bipartite graph B = (X,Y,E) is chordal bipartite if and only if the split graph resulting from making X a clique is strongly chordal.

A bipartite graph B = (X,Y,E) is chordal bipartite if and only if every induced subgraph of B has a maximum X-neighborhood ordering and a 
maximum Y-neighborhood ordering.

Various results describe the relationship between chordal bipartite graphs and totally balanced neighborhood hypergraphs of bipartite graphs.

 
A characterization of chordal bipartite graphs in terms of intersection graphs related to hypergraphs is given in. 
  
A bipartite graph is chordal bipartite if and only if its adjacency matrix is totally balanced if and only if the adjacency matrix is Gamma-free.

Recognition
Chordal bipartite graphs can be recognized in time  for a graph with n vertices and 
m edges.

Complexity of problems
Various problems such as Hamiltonian cycle, Steiner tree  and Efficient Domination 
 remain NP-complete on chordal bipartite graphs.

Various other problems which can be solved efficiently for bipartite graphs can be solved more efficiently for chordal bipartite graphs as discussed in

Related graph classes
Every chordal bipartite graph is a modular graph. The chordal bipartite graphs include the complete bipartite graphs and the bipartite distance-hereditary graphs.

Notes

References

.
.
.
.
.
.
.
.
.
.
.
.
.
.

Graph families
Bipartite graphs